Evensville is an unincorporated community in Rhea County, Tennessee, United States. In 2020 the population  was 2,624. Evensville has a post office with ZIP code 37332. Rhea County High School is located in Evensville.

History
The community is believed to have been named for an early settler, Evan Evens, Jr. (1790-1825), or his son, Joseph Smith Evens, or grandson John Haws Evens, the first postmaster.  Evensville was known as Darwin until 1878. .

Education
Rhea County Schools is the local school district. It operates two public schools in Evensville; Rhea County Middle School and Rhea County High School.

References

Unincorporated communities in Rhea County, Tennessee
Unincorporated communities in Tennessee